The Timber Creek Road Camp Barn  was built in 1931 to support the construction of Trail Ridge Road in Rocky Mountain National Park. The design is attributed to Thomas Chalmers Vint of the National Park Service Branch of Plans and Designs. The barn was moved in 2002 and used for storage.  It was listed on the National Register of Historic Places in 1987, and was delisted in 2022.

See also
National Register of Historic Places listings in Grand County, Colorado

References

External links

 Timber Creek Bunkhouse & Mess Hall, Trail Ridge Road, Grand Lake vicinity, Grand, CO at the Historic American Buildings Survey

Park buildings and structures on the National Register of Historic Places in Colorado
Infrastructure completed in 1931
National Park Service rustic in Colorado
National Register of Historic Places in Rocky Mountain National Park
Historic American Buildings Survey in Colorado
Barns on the National Register of Historic Places in Colorado
National Register of Historic Places in Grand County, Colorado
1931 establishments in Colorado
Relocated buildings and structures in Colorado
Former National Register of Historic Places in Colorado